Școala Centrală National College (literally Central School, formerly Zoia Kosmodeminskaia or just Zoia) is an institution of pre-primary, primary, secondary, and upper secondary public education in Sector 2, Bucharest, Romania. It functioned along the passing of time under many other names, most notably Pensionatul Domnesc de Fete. It serves schooling for the classes 0 to 12th grade, that is, from pre-primary school up to high school. 

During the Communist period, Școala Centrală was known as Zoia Kosmodeminskaia, a name which was ascribed to this institution for political reasons. After the 1989 Romanian Revolution, more specifically in 1994, the school's name was changed to Școala Centrală and bilingual French education was introduced for the classes with both humanist and exact sciences profiles pertaining to high school.

The school building, completed in 1890, is listed as a historic monument by Romania's Ministry of Culture and Religious Affairs. It was designed by Romanian architect Ion Mincu, renowned for developing the Romanian revival style.

Educational status 

The Central School of Bucharest (for short) is considered a good to very good high school in educational regards in Bucharest and nationwide in Romania, both in terms of the admission averages for high school as well as regarding the intellectual performances of the pupils at various national scholarly olympics and international contests as well.

Architectural style 
The building is a masterpiece of neo-Romanian ( neo-Brâncovenesc) architecture, designed by Ion Mincu, being the second building erected in this style. Its beauty and prestige granted it the title of historical monument in the Romanian registry of historical monuments.

Other usage 

In 1918, the building was used during the Austrian occupation of Bucharest throughout late World War I as the headquarters of the local post.

Gallery

References

External links 

  Official website

Educational institutions established in 1864
1864 establishments in Romania
High schools in Bucharest
National Colleges in Romania
School buildings completed in 1890
Neo-Brâncovenesc architecture